Navid Khonsari (born 1970) is an Iranian - Canadian video game, virtual/mixed reality, film and graphic novel creator, writer, director and producer.

Khonsari is the co-founder of iNK Stories, an award-winning studio creating innovative
original work across games, mixed reality (VR/AR), and immersive experiences. He has forged a new hybrid of documentary games, such as ”Verite Games”. Khonsari created the 1979 Revolution: Black Friday, which received the industry’s top honors: a BAFTA, Facebook Game of the Year, Tribeca FF Storyscape, among others, being also recognized by UNESCO as digital work displaying peaceful conflict resolution. Khonsari is credited with having ushered in the current wave of contemporary AAA video games, such as Grand Theft Auto, Max Payne, Red Dead Revolver, and The Warriors, up to the recent Resident Evil: Biohazard. He is an adjunct professor at Johns Hopkins, and guest lectures at Yale, Princeton, Columbia, Duke, Northwestern in Qatar, the White House, UN, Sundance  and more.

Early life 
Khonsari was raised in his homeland Iran until 10. He fled Iran as a political refugee to Canada after the 1979 Revolution with his family. He graduated from the University of British Columbia and the Vancouver Film School.

Career 
His first short film was titled Arcade Angels, which focused on video game burnouts who robbed a video rental store in an attempt to open an arcade. He wrote and produced The Contract, his first film with Billy Dee Williams.

Khonsari broke onto the gaming scene with his work on Grand Theft Auto III and Max Payne when he joined Rockstar Games in 2000. During his 5 years at Rockstar Games Khonsari was the cinematic director and built the production pipeline on Grand Theft Auto III, Vice City, Grand Theft Auto: San Andreas, Max Payne, Max Payne 2: The Fall of Max Payne, Midnight Club II, Manhunt, Red Dead Revolver, Midnight Club 3: DUB Edition, The Warriors, Grand Theft Auto: Liberty City Stories and Grand Theft Auto: Vice City Stories.

In 2006, he left Rockstar Games and has since worked on a number of games including Alan Wake and Homefront. He met his wife, Vassiliki, while directing the award-winning documentary Pindemonium, where she acted as the cinematographer and producer of this feature, which aired on the Sundance Channel. Together, Navid and Vassiliki co-founded iNK Stories and produced another documentary, Pulling John, which premiered at South by Southwest and streamed on Netflix. iNK Stories, is an independent entertainment company that is recognized for its bold, original voice in titles such as their 2016 launched 1979 Revolution: Black Friday. 

1979 Revolution: Black Friday receiving industry's top honors including BAFTA, Facebook Game of the Year, DICE, Indiecade, NY Game Critics, Tribeca FF Storyscape, Lumiere and recognized by UNESCO as a digital solution for peaceful conflict resolution - as a result, Khonsari was politically exiled by the government of Iran - deemed a US spy. Khonsari's subsequent titles, also lauded as innovative breakthroughs that reframe the human experience, including HERO (site-specific multi-sensory VR experience of civilian warfare in Syria) premiered at Sundance and Tribeca Film Festival winning the Storyscape Award for Best Immersive, Blindfold premiering at Sheffield, Fire Escape Tribeca Film Festival––and currently Who is Michael Sterling? with Columbia and Standford. Working with Capcom, Khonsari worked on Resident Evil Biohazard both the console and VR versions. 

Khonsari is a juror and a member of the Peabody Interactive Board for the Peabody Awards.

Works 
 Hero (Multi-Sensory, Location Based VR) (2018)
 Fire Escape (VR Series) (2018)
 Resident Evil 7: Biohazard (2017)
 Blindfold (Interactive VR) (2017)
 1979 Revolution: Black Friday (2016)
 Homefront (2011)
 Alan Wake  (2010)
 Grand Theft Auto: Vice City Stories  (2006)
 Grand Theft Auto: Liberty City Stories (2005)
 The Warriors (2005)
 Grand Theft Auto: San Andreas (2004)
 Max Payne 2: The Fall of Max Payne - A Film Noir Love Story (2003)
 Midnight Club 3: DUB Edition (2005)
 Red Dead Revolver (2004)
 Manhunt (2003)
 Midnight Club II (2003)
 Grand Theft Auto: Vice City (2002) (PlayStation 2)
 Grand Theft Auto III (2001) (PlayStation 2)
 Max Payne (2001) (Xbox)

References

External links 
Navid Khonsari's company iNK Stories
Joystiq.com
IFC.com
Pulling John Website

Living people
Video game directors
Iranian people in the video game industry
1970 births
Writers from Montreal
Writers from New York City
People from Tehran
University of British Columbia alumni
Vancouver Film School alumni
Iranian emigrants to Canada
Canadian emigrants to the United States
Canadian male voice actors
Video game writers
Canadian documentary film directors
Iranian documentary film directors
Canadian graphic novelists
Canadian voice directors
Iranian voice directors
Canadian documentary film producers
Iranian documentary film producers